Sutera is a comune (municipality) in the Province of Caltanissetta in the Italian region Sicily, located about  southeast of Palermo and about  west of Caltanissetta. The area is dominated by a large monolithic rock termed "The Mountain of San Paolino". Upon this mountain sits the bones of the patron saints of the town, St. Paolino and St. Onofrio. On the Feast of San Onofrio, almost all those in the town walk to the top of the mountain, as a pilgrimage to the saints. As a surname, Sutera has variations that include Souter, Suter, Sudder, and Sutar due to Anglo-Saxon influence during the conquest of Italy. The name refers to both the Rock of Sicily, and a High-German/Middle-Latin word for a cobble or shoe maker 

Sutera holds the award of "bandiere arancioni" from the touring club Italiano. Sutera is currently the only place in Sicily to hold this accolade, which is awarded to touristic areas of excellence.

Sutera borders the following municipalities: Acquaviva Platani, Bompensiere, Campofranco, Casteltermini, Milena, Mussomeli.

Sutera is twinned with the Borough of Broxbourne in England.

Recently, the population has had a decrease because of the lack of work in the area. Youngsters had moved away leaving Sutera with mainly elder citizens. However, in the last few years the town has been transformed by the influx of asylum seekers which has saved the local school and boosted the local economy.

People linked to Sutera
Giuseppe Sorge (1857–1937), historian, prefect and director of the public security. 
 (1880–1955) Senator, Prefect and Politician.

References

External links 
 www.comune.sutera.cl.it/

Cities and towns in Sicily